Volodymyr Kornutyak (born 24 July 1983 in Ukrainian SSR) is a Ukrainian football defender who plays for FC Mynai in the Ukrainian Second League.

External links 
Profile on EUFO Squad Website

1983 births
Living people
Ukrainian footballers
Association football defenders
FC Prykarpattia Ivano-Frankivsk (2004) players
FC Kharkiv players
FC Hoverla Uzhhorod players
Kisvárda FC players
FC Mynai players
Ukrainian expatriate footballers
Expatriate footballers in Hungary
Ukrainian expatriate sportspeople in Hungary